The  is a railway line in Japan operated by Hokkaido Railway Company (JR Hokkaido). The main Sekishō Line connects  in Chitose and Shintoku Station in the town of Shintoku.

Basic data
Distances
Main line, Minami-Chitose - Shintoku: 132.4 km
Operators
Hokkaido Railway Company (category 1)
Minami-Chitose - Shintoku: 132.4 km
Japan Freight Railway Company (category 2)
Minami-Chitose - Kami-Ochiai Junction: 108.3 km
Track: single
Block system: Automatic

Services
The Marimo sleeping car service which formerly operated between Sapporo and Kushiro, was discontinued in 2008.

Stations

Main Line

Closed stations 
  Higashi-Oiwake: closed 25 March 2016
   Tomisato: closed 25 March 2016

Yūbari Branch (closed since 1 April 2019)

Passing loops and junctions

Kami-Ochiai Junction

 is a junction in Minamifurano, Sorachi.

Passing Loops between Minami-Chitose and Kami-Ochiai Junction

Komasato Passing Loop

 is a passing loop in Chitose, Hokkaidō with two tracks and two snow shelters.

Nishi-Hayakita Passing Loop

 is a passing loop in Abira, Hokkaidō with two tracks and two snow shelters (one of them is connected to a tunnel).

Takinoshita Passing Loop

 is a passing loop in Kuriyama, Hokkaidō with two tracks and two snow shelters.

Kaede Passing Loop

 is a passing loop in Yūbari, Hokkaidō with two tracks and two snow shelters. It was Kaede Station before 12 March 1994.

Osawa Passing Loop

 is a passing loop in Mukawa, Hokkaidō with two tracks and two snow shelters.

Higashi-Osawa Passing Loop

 is a passing loop in Mukawa with two tracks and two snow shelters.

Seifūzan Passing Loop

 is a passing loop in Shimukappu, Hokkaidō with two tracks and two snow shelters.

Onitōge Passing Loop

 was a passing loop in Shimukappu with two tracks. It was located in Onitōge tunnel and taken out of service from 3 March 1986.

Higashi-Shimukappu Passing Loop

 is a passing loop in Shimukappu with two tracks and two snow shelters.

Takinosawa Passing Loop

 is a passing loop in Shimukappu with two tracks and two snow shelters.

Horoka Passing Loop

 is a passing loop in Shimukappu with two tracks and two snow shelters. It was completed in 1981 as Tomamu Passing Loop, but was renamed in 1987 to avoid confusion with Tomamu Station.

Kushinai Passing Loop

 is a passing loop in Minamifurano, Hokkaidō with three tracks and two snow shelters. The center track is bidirectional.

Passing Loops between Kami-Ochiai Junction and Shintoku
There are three passing loops shared by the Sekishō Line and Nemuro Main Line between Kami-Ochiai Junction and Shintoku Station.

Shin-Karikachi Passing Loop

 is a passing loop in Shintoku, Hokkaidō with two tracks and two snow shelters. The loop is located next to the eastern mouth of 5,790 m long Shin-Karikachi tunnel.

Hirouchi Passing Loop

 is a passing loop in Shintoku, Hokkaidō with three tracks and two snow shelters. The west track is used for siding for both up and down.

Nishi-Shintoku Passing Loop

 is a passing loop in Shintoku, Hokkaidō with two tracks and two snow shelters.

History

In 1906, the Japanese Government nationalised the company, and double-tracked the line between 1912 and 1919. However, the line was single-tracked in 1932. The abandoned western tunnel north of Shimizusawa, and significant portions of the second line formation are still visible.

The Minami-Chitose - Oiwake and Shin-Yūbari - Kami-Ochiai Junction (on the Nemuro Main Line) sections opened in 1981, becoming the two ends of the Sekishō Line. The Yūbari Line was renamed in two sections, the section between Oiwake and Shin-Yūbari becoming the mid section of the Sekishō Line, and the section between Shin-Yūbari and Yūbari becoming the Yūbari Branch Line of the Sekishō Line. The new line shortened the main route to eastern Hokkaido. Previously, passengers to Shintoku and further east had to travel via the Nemuro Main Line.

In 1985 the Yūbari station was relocated 1.3 km south of its original location, and it was moved another 800 m south in 1990.

Closure of Yūbari Branch Line
On 17 August 2016 JR Hokkaido announced the Yūbari Branch Line from Shin-Yūbari to Yūbari would close.
The branch line closed on 31 March 2019.

Line disruptions
On 25 August 2016, torrential rain from Typhoon Mindulle caused erosion at Horoka passing loop, closing the Shin-Yūbari - Shintoku section until 29 August. However, on 31 August further torrential rain from Typhoon Lionrock caused further erosion at Tomamu, closing the section again until 1 October.

Former connecting lines

 Shin-Yūbari station - In 1916, a 7.6 km branch opened from Momijiyama (later Shin-Yūbari) to Noborikawa, approximately on the same alignment as the later Shin-Yūbari - Kami-Ochiai Junction line. It closed in 1980.

Three separate private railways connected to the Yūbari line:
 Numanosawa station - The 4.4 km line to the Hokutan Mayachi coal mine operated from 1913 until the closure of the mine in 1987. 
 Shimizusawa station - The Mitsubishi Yūbari line opened to South Yūbari (7.6 km) in 1911, and extended 9.6 km to Sumiyawa in 1929. The Sumiyawa section closed in 1973, and the original 7.6 km section closed in 1987. 
 Yūbari station - The Hokkaido Colliery and Steamship Co. built a 34 km line from Kuriyama on the Muroran Main Line (including a bridge over that line) to Yūbari in 1926, including a switch-back (or zig-zag) section at Nishikisawa. A 23 km extension opened from Kuriyama - Nopporo (on the Hakodate Main Line 18 km east of Sapporo) in 1930. At its peak in 1965, the line carried 1.5 million tonnes of coal and another 0.5 million tonnes of general freight annually, as well as 2 million passengers. The entire line closed in 1975 after the closure of the mine in 1972. A 4.7 km branch to the Tsunoda mine operated from 1927 until 1970.

Accidents

2011 Super Ōzora derailment and fire
On 27 May 2011, the Super Ōzora 14 service from Kushiro to Sapporo was brought to an emergency stop inside the 685 metre-long No. 1 Niniu Tunnel in Shimukappu, Hokkaidō, at around 21:55 after car number 2 of the 6-car formation became derailed. The train caught fire, and all of the 245 people on board, including train staff eventually evacuated the train. 39 were treated for smoke inhalation and minor burn injuries. The burnt-out train was removed from the tunnel on 29 May 2011.

2012 Higashi-Oiwake Station derailment
At around 20:50 on 16 February 2012, a freight train derailed at Higashi-Oiwake Station after passing a signal at red and colliding with the wall of a snow shelter adjacent to the station.

The up container freight train from Kushiro Freight Terminal to Sapporo Freight Terminal was normally scheduled to pass Higashi-Oiwake Station non-stop, but on this occasion faced a red signal to allow the delayed down Super Ōzora 13 service to pass in the opposite direction. The driver reportedly applied the brakes, but the train failed to stop and was derailed by the catch points protecting the single-track line, hitting the wall of a snow shelter protecting the junction. The JR Freight Class DF200 diesel locomotive and four of the container wagons in the train were derailed, but the lone 25-year-old driver was uninjured. Six train services were cancelled as a result.

See also
List of railway lines in Japan

References
This article incorporates material from the corresponding article in the Japanese Wikipedia

External links

 JR Hokkaido official website 

Rail transport in Hokkaido
Lines of Hokkaido Railway Company
1067 mm gauge railways in Japan